Nadekan-e Gurmi (also Romanized as Nadekān-e Gūrmī; also known as Nadeh Kān-e Gūrmī) is a village in Pir Sohrab Rural District, in the Central District of Chabahar County, Sistan and Baluchestan Province, Iran. At the 2006 census, its population was 262, in 45 families.

References 

Populated places in Chabahar County